The Conway School (Conway), is a graduate program for sustainable landscape design and planning. It was founded in 1972 in a rural  campus in Conway, Massachusetts, and in 2015 opened a new campus in a renovated mill in Easthampton, Massachusetts. In 2018, the school moved to a renovated historic Coach House building in the Village Hill neighborhood of Northampton, Massachusetts. The graduate school offers a unique Master of Science degree in Ecological Design. The school accepts about twenty students each year into its 10-month program.

The mission of the Conway School is to explore, develop, practice, and teach design that is ecologically and socially sustainable. The program puts particular emphasis on communication skills and community building. Students work on real projects with real clients at varying scales, from residential landscaping to urban planning and management of entire watersheds and food system. The curriculum and projects are designed to provide graduates with the basic knowledge and skills necessary to practice the planning, design, and management of the land that respects nature as well as humanity; develop ecological awareness, understanding, respect, and accommodation in the school's students and project clients; and produce projects that fit human use to natural conditions.

Conway's founder, landscape architect and planner Walter Cudnohofsky, served as director from 1972 to 1992. Donald Walker, alum of the class of 1978, was the director from 1992 to 2005. Landscape architect Paul Cawood Hellmund served as director from 2006 to 2015. In 2016, the school adopted a shared leadership model. Currently, alum and former board member Bruce Stedman '78 is executive director, Ken Byrne is academic director and alum Priscilla Novitt is administrative director.

References

External links
Official website

Educational institutions established in 1972
Private universities and colleges in Massachusetts
Universities and colleges in Hampshire County, Massachusetts
Landscape architecture
1972 establishments in Massachusetts